Saint Gwinear was a Celtic martyr, one of only two early Cornish saints whose biographies survived the Reformation. The Life of Gwinear was written in the early 14th century by a priest named Anselm, and has sometimes been printed among Saint Anselm's works.  His feast day is March 23.

Born in Ireland with the Irish name of Fingar, he was converted to Christianity by Saint Patrick and after spending time in Brittany went with 7 (or 777) companions to Cornwall, landing at Hayle, where he was martyred by King Teudar.   Saint Gwinear was said to have died with his followers by being thrown into a pit of reptiles. An alternative version sets the story in Brittany with Saint Guiner being martyred at the hands of Prince Tewdwr. 

The Victorian clergyman, hagiographer and antiquary Sabine Baring-Gould believed that an Irish group, driven from their homeland in Ossory in the fifth century, invaded Penwith (="pen-gwaeth", the "bloody headland"), and that the legend of Gwinear was a distorted recollection of these events.

References
Footnotes

Citations

External links

Cephalophores
Medieval Breton saints
Medieval Cornish saints
Medieval Irish saints of Cornwall
Executed Irish people